Shannon Kimes (born April 6, 1977) is an  American politician who served as a Delegate from the 9th district to the West Virginia House of Delegates from 2020 to 2022. Kimes is a Republican.

Early life, education, and career
Kimes was born in Rockport, West Virginia to Dennis and Charlotte Kimes. He has a Bachelor of Engineering from Case Western Reserve University. Before taking office, Kimes operated a company that manufactured railroad construction materials.

Elections

2020
Kimes won his primary election against incumbent Chuck Little, who had been appointed by West Virginia governor Jim Justice, with Kimes receiving 58.53% of the vote.

In the general election, Kimes defeated Democrat Jim Marion with 70.31% of the vote.

2022 
Kimes lost his primary election in the 14th district to Dave Foggin.

Tenure

Committee assignments
Banking and Insurance
Government Organization
Political Subdivisions
Workforce Development

Legislature size
In the House of Delegates, Kimes introduced House Joint Resolution 29, which would introduce a constitutional amendment on the ballot to reduce the number of Delegates and State Senators by half. Kimes cited differences in represented populations between West Virginia and other states.

Spending
Kimes criticized Justice for declining to use much of the relief money from the 2020 CARES Act. He was the lead sponsor of House Bill 2014, which would emphasize the Legislature's role in the allocation of federal funds and limiting the governor's control over those funds.

Personal life
Kimes is married to Erica Kimes and has three children. He is a Christian.

References

1977 births
21st-century American politicians
Living people
Republican Party members of the West Virginia House of Delegates
People from Wood County, West Virginia
Case Western Reserve University alumni